The 1991 East Devon District Council election took place on 2 May 1991 to elect members of East Devon District Council in England. This was on the same day as other local elections. There were minor changes to the district boundaries for this elections.

New district boundaries

District boundary changes took place effective April 1988. No districts were added or created. All changes involved the city of Exeter, which borders East Devon to the west. The areas transferred from Exeter to East Devon had a population of about nine persons; the areas transferred from East Devon to Exeter had an estimated population of 189.

Ward results

Axminster Hamlets

Axminster Town

Beer

Broadclyst

Budleigh Salterton

Clyst Valley

Clystbeare

Colyton

Eden Vale

Exe Valley

Exmouth Brixington

Exmouth Halsdon

Exmouth Littleham Rural

Exmouth Littleham Urban

Exmouth Withycombe Raleigh

Exmouth Withycombe Urban

Honiton St. Michaels

Honiton St. Pauls

Lympstone

Newbridges

Newton Poppleford & Harpford

Otterhead

Ottery St. Mary Rural

Ottery St. Mary Town

Patteson

Raleigh

Seaton

Sidmouth Rural

Sidmouth Town

Sidmouth Woolbrook

Tale Vale

Trinity

Upper Axe

Woodbury

Yarty

References

1991 English local elections
May 1991 events in the United Kingdom
East Devon District Council elections
1990s in Devon